The Pike County Courthouse is a historic courthouse located at 801 Main St. in Petersburg, Pike County, Indiana.  It was designed by architects Elmer E. Dunlap and of Jasper N. Good and built in 1922.  It is a three-story, Neoclassical style, nearly square, concrete and buff brick building with slightly projecting pavilions on three sides.  It measures 114 feet by 109 feet.  Also on the property are five contributing objects: a GAR memorial, veterans' memorial, and three metal street lamps.

It was listed on the National Register of Historic Places in 2008.

References

County courthouses in Indiana
Courthouses on the National Register of Historic Places in Indiana
Neoclassical architecture in Indiana
Government buildings completed in 1922
Buildings and structures in Pike County, Indiana
National Register of Historic Places in Pike County, Indiana